Men of Valor is a first-person shooter video game developed by 2015, Inc. and published by Vivendi Universal Games for the Microsoft Windows and Xbox platforms. Men of Valor is based on the Unreal Engine 2.0 and simulates infantry combat during the Vietnam War, more specifically, the Tet Offensive in 1968. The game was released in 2004 to mostly positive reviews.

Plot
The story of Men of Valor follows Dean Shepard and his squad of Marines from the 3rd Battalion of the 3rd Marine Division in 1968, through sixteen missions during the Vietnam War including missions at the height of the Tet Offensive. In historically-based scenarios, the player assumes a variety of roles in which they man the door gun on a Huey helicopter, steer a riverboat along enemy-infested shores, battle their way through enemy tunnel complexes, and call down fire as a forward observer. Mission types include pilot rescues, recon patrols, POW rescue, and search-and-destroy ops, all typical objectives throughout the offensive. Between missions are film clips in both Black and White and Colour showcasing the real war, a similar approach to most WWII games at the time.

Development
Men of Valor was developed by 2015, Inc. shortly after work finished on Medal of Honor: Allied Assault.

Reception

The game received "mixed or average reviews" on both platforms according to the review aggregation website Metacritic, with 73/100 for Xbox and 71/100 for Microsoft Windows. Eurogamer gave the title 6/10, while IGN gave the PC version 6.8/10, and the Xbox version 7.8/10.

References

External links
Official website via Internet Archive

2004 video games
2015, Inc. games
First-person shooters
Video games about the United States Marine Corps
Unreal Engine games
Video games developed in the United States
Video games featuring black protagonists
Video games scored by Inon Zur
Vietnam War video games
Video games set in Vietnam
Windows games
Xbox games